Maïna Militza is a Canadian make-up artist. She is known for working with filmmaker Xavier Dolan.

Militza is affiliated with the agency Folio Montreal. She worked for Dolan on the 2014 film Mommy, for which she won the Canadian Screen Award for Best Makeup. With Denis Vidal, Militza worked on the make-up for Dolan's 2016 film It's Only the End of the World, and shared the Canadian Screen Award with Vidal. In April 2017, she also received a Prix Iris nomination for Best Make-Up for It's Only the End of the World.

References

External links
Maïna Militza at the Internet Movie Database

Artists from Montreal
Canadian make-up artists
Best Makeup Genie and Canadian Screen Award winners
Living people
Year of birth missing (living people)
Canadian women in film